Fejér may refer to:

Fejér County, Hungary
Fejér (former county), Hungary
Fejér (surname), Hungarian surname